The acts of the 109th United States Congress includes all Acts of Congress and ratified treaties by the 109th United States Congress, which lasted from January 3, 2005 to January 3, 2007

Acts include public and private laws, which are enacted after being passed by Congress and signed by the President, however if the President vetoes a bill it can still be enacted by a two-thirds vote in both houses. The Senate alone considers treaties, which are ratified by a two-thirds vote.

Summary of actions
President George W. Bush vetoed the Stem Cell Research Enhancement Act of 2005 during this Congress.  This bill was not enacted by Congress over the President's veto.

Public laws

Private laws

Treaties
No treaties were ratified during this Congress.

See also 
List of United States federal legislation
List of acts of the 108th United States Congress
List of acts of the 110th United States Congress

References

External links

 Authenticated Public and Private Laws from the Federal Digital System
 Legislation & Records Home: Treaties from the Senate
 Private Laws for the 109th Congress at Congress.gov
 Public Laws for the 109th Congress at Congress.gov

 
109